Sutton Bank is a hill in the Hambleton District of the North York Moors National Park, North Yorkshire in England. It is a high point on the Hambleton Hills with extensive views over the Vale of York and the Vale of Mowbray.

At the foot of Sutton Bank lies the village of Sutton-under-Whitestonecliffe; at 27 letters long, it has the longest hyphenated placename in England.

The A170 road runs down the bank with a maximum gradient of 1 in 4 (25%), and including a hairpin bend. Vehicles have to keep in low gear whilst travelling up or down the bank, and caravans are banned from using the section.

History
Just to the south of Sutton Bank is Roulston Scar, the site of one of the most important prehistoric monuments in the region—a massive hillfort built in the Iron Age, around 400 BC. 

It was the approximate location of the Battle of Old Byland in which the Scots won a major victory over the English on 14 October 1322. King Robert the Bruce had made a forced march with his army in an attempt to surprise the English army which was retreating from a failed invasion of Scotland. The Scots fought their way up the steep hillside to totally defeat the Earl whom they took prisoner. King Edward fled ahead of Sir Walter Stewart's forces leaving behind in the Abbey the Great Seal of England and much treasure. 

In 1981 a body was found at Sutton Bank. She was never identified and she became known as the Sutton Bank Body.

In 2016 Sutton Bank was included on the route of the third stage of the Tour de Yorkshire cycle race.

Recreation
Because it faces the prevailing westerly winds, Sutton Bank has been used for ridge soaring since the early 1930s for the sport of gliding. The Yorkshire Gliding Club is based at the top of the hill.

Also at the top of the hill is the Sutton Bank National Park Centre, where a high-tech Lime & Ice exhibition tells the story of how the iconic landscape and view came to be through the dramatic action of ice age glaciers. There is also an official tourist information centre, a tea room and a gift shop. Outside, there is a car park, from where pushchair and wheelchair friendly paths leading to a viewing platform, which offers views of Roulston Scar, Hood Hill, Gormire Lake and beyond. There are many legends about Gormire Lake, one of which is that there is a submerged village beneath its waters.

There are many other walking trails close by, including southwards to the popular White Horse of Kilburn. It includes a spur to the White Horse of Kilburn.

The North York Moors National Park Authority has developed new cycle trails, which use a mixture of natural and man made trails similar to those found in a purpose built trail centre. Using the same style of trail marking, the mountain biking trails available are:

 'Cliff' - 3 mile green mostly level, circular off-road cycle trail for families that in part follows the famous cliff edge. The trail opened at the end of 2013
 'Fort' - 9 mile blue trail with 361m ascent/descent (70% stone, 30% natural surface) runs out past the site of the Iron Age fort at Boltby Scar. A shorter loop of 6 miles avoids the ascent/descent and is suitable for families. The Fort route also includes part of the Cliff Trail along the cliff edge.
 'Paradise' - 17-mile 'red' trail, making use of existing bridleways that have been upgraded but are shared with walkers and horse riders.

There is also a purpose-built bike skills area and a new cycle centre, Sutton Bank Bikes, offers cycle hire, training and skills courses, a bike wash, repair and servicing and a fully stocked cycle shop.

Sutton Bank is an official Dark Sky Discovery Site, one of two in the North York Moors.

References

External links
Official website
Sutton Bank Bikes

Panoramic views from Sutton Bank here and here.

Mountains and hills of North Yorkshire
North York Moors